Demir means iron in Turkish; it may refer to:

Given name
Demir Demirkan, Turkish rock musician and songwriter
Demir Demirev, Bulgarian weightlifter
Demir Elmaağaçlı (born 1990), Turkish archer
Demir Hotić, Bosnia and Herzegovina footballer
Demir Ramović, Montenegrin footballer
Demir Sabancı, Turkish businessman and entrepreneur

Surname
Demir or D. Mir, pseudonyms of Romanian poet Mircea Demetriade
Aykut Demir, Turkish footballer
Bahadır Demir (1942–1973), Turkish assassinated diplomat
Cem Demir, Turkish footballer
Emine Demir (born 1993), Turkish footballer
Erdin Demir, Swedish footballer of Turkish descent
Evin Demir (born 2001), Turkish race walker
Hamza Demir (born 1956), Swedish politician
İlyas Demir, Turkish karateka
Mahmut Demir, Turkish wrestler
Mahmut Demir (futsal), Turkish futsal player
Mustafa Demir, Turkish politician
Neslihan Demir Darnel (born 1983), Turkish volleyballer
Orhan Demir, Canadian jazz guitarist
Yusuf Demir (born 2003), Austrian Footballer
Zeki Demir, Turkish karateka

See also
Demir Kapija, town in the Republic of Macedonia
Demir Hisar (town), town in the Republic of Macedonia
Demirović
Temur (disambiguation)
Timur
Demir, Kemaliye

Turkish-language surnames
Turkish masculine given names
Bosniak masculine given names
Bosnian masculine given names